Lambert Williamson (1907–1975) was a British composer and conductor known for his work on film scores. During the late 1940s he worked for the Rank Organisation.

Selected filmography

 Excuse My Glove (1936)
 The Edge of the World (1937)
 The End of the River (1947)
 One Night with You (1948)
 Woman Hater (1948)
 Good-Time Girl (1948)
 Cardboard Cavalier (1949)
 Don't Ever Leave Me (1949)
 They Were Not Divided (1950)
 Green Grow the Rushes (1951)
 Stryker of the Yard (1953)
 Cosh Boy (1953)
 Beat the Devil (1953)
 The Good Die Young (1954)
 Forbidden Cargo (1954)
 To Dorothy a Son (1954)
 The Green Carnation (1954)
 Secret Venture (1955)
 Track the Man Down (1955)
 Abdulla the Great (1955)
 Cross Channel (1955)
 Dry Rot (1956)
 Sailor Beware! (1956)
 The Story of Esther Costello (1957)
 The Spaniard's Curse (1958)
 This Other Eden (1959)
 The Innocents (1961)
 The Adding Machine (1969)

References

Bibliography
 Lochner, Jim. The Music of Charlie Chaplin. McFarland, 2018.

External links

1907 births
1975 deaths
People from Cleethorpes
British film score composers